The 2022 Men's T20I Inter-Insular Series, consisting of three Twenty20 International (T20I) matches, was held in Guernsey from 20 to 21 May 2022. The first match was played at College Field in Saint Peter Port, and the remaining matches were played at King George V Sports Ground in Castel.

Jersey and Guernsey have played an Inter-Insular cricket match annually since 1950, generally as 50-over contests. A Twenty20 series was played for the first time in 2018, and the 2019 T20 Inter-Insular Cup had official T20I status for the first time, following the International Cricket Council's decision to grant T20I status to all matches played between Associate Members after 1 January 2019. Jersey are the defending champions of the T20I Inter-Insular series, having won the 2019 series 3–0. There were no Inter-Insular matches in 2020 or 2021 due to the COVID-19 pandemic. Prior to this series, Jersey were on a ten-game winning streak against Guernsey across all formats.

Jersey claimed another 3–0 series win to retain the T20 trophy. Jersey won the first match by 37 runs, the second match by 60 runs, and the third match again by 37 runs. All-rounder Harrison Carlyon put in man-of-the-match performances in both of the first two games to play a major part in securing the series for Jersey. After Guernsey had taken two early wickets in the final game of the series, Jersey's Asa Tribe scored 65 runs from 32 balls to lead his side to their highest total in an official T20I.

The teams also contested the 50-over Inter-Insular Trophy match in Jersey in September 2022, and a women's T20I series was played in June 2022.

T20I series

Squads

1st T20I

2nd T20I

3rd T20I

50-over match
The 50-over Inter-Insular Trophy match was played on 3 September 2022. The match was played at Jersey's Farmers Cricket Club Ground in St Martin. This was the 68th annual Inter-Insular Trophy match between the two sides. Jersey won the match by two-wickets to retain the Inter-Insular Trophy, despite a batting collapse causing a scare when chasing Guernsey's low target of 106.

Squads

Only 50-over match

See also
 Inter-Insular cricket
 2019 T20 Inter-Insular Cup

References

External links
 Series home at ESPN Cricinfo

Associate international cricket competitions in 2022
International cricket competitions in Guernsey